Stillwell is an unincorporated community in St. Albans Township, Hancock County, Illinois, United States. It is located about 5 minutes south of West Point, but in terms of postal delivery is usually considered part of West Point. The town currently has approximately 40 residents.

References
 

Unincorporated communities in Illinois
Unincorporated communities in Hancock County, Illinois